Toward Freedom is a 2014 Iranian drama film written and directed by Mehrshad Karkhani.

Plot 
Two young people (Mani Heidari & Omid Olomi) live in an old and closed cinema, one day they decide to go inside the city to get their money.

Cast 
 Omid Olomi
 Mani Heidari
 Sahar Ghoreishi
 Soroush Sehhat
 Reza Naji
 Shohreh Ghamar
 Ramin Rastad
 Ladan Parvin
 Hesam Shojaei
 Keramat Roudsaz
 Zabi Afshar
 Iman Mahmoodi
 Faranak Koshafar

References

External links

Toward Freedom on Namava
Toward Freedom on Salam Cinama

2014 films
2010s Persian-language films
2014 drama films
Iranian drama films